The Haunting of Seacliff Inn is a 1994 American made-for-television mystery film starring Ally Sheedy and William R. Moses. It was written by Walter Klenhard and Tom Walla and directed by Klenhard. The film originally aired on USA Network on September 22, 1994.

Plot
A couple starts to live in strange and scary situations when they move to an old house in a seaside town.

Cast
 Ally Sheedy as Susan Enright
 William R. Moses as Mark Enright
 Lucinda Weist as Sara Warner
 Tom McCleister as John
 Maxine Stuart as Lorraine Adler
 Shannon Cochran as Sheriff Tomizack
 Louise Fletcher as Dorothy O'Hara
 Jay W. MacIntosh as Caroline
 James Horan as Jeremiah Hastings

Reception
TV Guide gave it two out of four stars, stating: "Although not terribly scary, THE HAUNTING OF SEACLIFF INN unfolds in an effectively moody, slow-paced fashion. Much too chatty, it does offer logical explanations for the so-called "supernatural" events, and also cleverly insinuates the legend of Jeremiah and Olivia into the Enrights' own troubled marital history." Tony Scott from Variety magazine wrote: "Sheedy plays her role with striking confidence, and Moses, who had a longtime run as Perry Mason’s associate Ken Malansky, gives his role a becoming sincerity. Maxine Stuart charmingly plays the former owner of the house, and Fletcher gives the story some surprising substance. The Mendocino house itself is a gem, and production designer Anthony Tremblay tries parlaying it into something frightening. Tech credits are good but the story’s not there. A ghost story’s disappointing if the blood runs thin, not cold."

References

External
 
 

1994 television films
1994 films
1990s mystery films
American mystery films
American horror thriller films
USA Network original films
Films scored by Shirley Walker
American horror television films
1990s American films